This list comprises persons who belong to the Jewish faith, who have been elected to the federal House of Commons, legislative assemblies of provinces and territories, and members appointed to the Senate.

The first Jewish Canadian politician elected after Confederation was Henry Nathan Jr., elected as a Liberal MP to the House of Commons in a by-election in 1871. Both George Benjamin and Selim Franklin were elected in pre-Confederation Canada and are therefore not listed.

There have been 45 Jewish Canadians who have served as Members of Parliament, as well as 19 who have been named Senators. After the 2015 Canadian election, the highest number of Jews were elected to Parliament in history - with 7 MPs (2.1% of the House of Commons). Elected in the 2021 Canadian Federal Election, Melissa Lantsman became the ninth currently-serving Jewish MP. Of the current federal Jewish politicians, 6 are Liberals (6 MPs, 0 Senators), 3 are Conservatives (2 MPs, 1 Senators), 1 is a New Democrat (1 MP, 0 Senators) and one sits as an Independent (1 senator).

Provincially, Jews have been elected to 9 of the 13 legislatures – with only New Brunswick, Prince Edward Island, Northwest Territories and Nunavut never having Jewish representation. There are currently four Jews serving in three provincial legislatures. Of those members, three are Conservative (two Progressive Conservative, one United Conservative) and one is Liberal (one Quebec Liberal).

Federal

House of Commons

Senate

Provincial

Alberta

British Columbia

Manitoba

Newfoundland and Labrador

Saskatchewan

Nova Scotia

Ontario

Quebec

Yukon

See also
 List of Canadian Jews
List of electoral firsts in Canada
List of visible minority politicians in Canada
List of indigenous Canadian politicians

References 

Jewish